Wonderful Year is a children's novel by Nancy Barnes (Helen Simmons Adams) with illustrations by Kate Seredy.  Wonderful Year was published in 1946 by publisher Julian Messner.  It describes a year in the life of the Martin family, including 11-year-old Ellen, who moved from Kansas to a fruit ranch in Colorado.  This work of children's literature was a Newbery Honor recipient in 1947.

References

1946 American novels
American children's novels
Newbery Honor-winning works
Novels set in Colorado
1946 children's books
Julian Messner books